Thomas McEllistrim (14 October 1894 – 4 December 1973) was an Irish Fianna Fáil politician who served as a Teachta Dála (TD) from 1923 to 1969. He was a military activist in the period from 1916 to 1923.

Guerrilla fighter
He joined the Ballymacelligott company of the Irish Volunteers in 1914 and was involved in an abortive attempt by Roger Casement to land arms for the Easter Rising at Banna Strand in County Kerry. After the rebellion he was interned by the British at Frongoch internment camp in Wales for his role in the events. In April 1918, he led an arms raid on Gortatlea Royal Irish Constabulary barracks in which two Volunteers were killed. It was one of the first acts of guerrilla warfare in the period.

McEllistrim served in the Irish Republican Army in Kerry throughout the Irish War of Independence of 1919 to 1921. He was instrumental in the setting up of first an Active service unit (in June 1920) and then a larger "flying column", or full-time guerrilla unit in the IRA's Second Kerry Brigade in early 1921. His column fought in both the Clonbanin Ambush and the Headford Ambush in the spring of 1921. At the latter action, in which the IRA ambushed a train carrying British troops, Dan Allman, the leader of the flying column was killed, leaving McEllistrim in command. 

According to historian T. Ryle Dwyer, "McEllistrim arguably played as important a role in the War of Independence as Tom Barry or Dan Breen but he never wrote a book about his exploits, nor was he prepared to talk about them publicly... Even though McEllistrim sat in the Dáil for over forty years, he apparently never mentioned the period in Leinster House".

He rejected the Anglo-Irish Treaty and fought in the Anti-Treaty IRA during the Irish Civil War of 1922 to 1923. He was one of the senior IRA figures in Kerry during this conflict, under the command of Humphrey Murphy. In the war's early months, he commanded a Kerry column in the fighting in Limerick and at the Battle of Kilmallock, before retreating back into Kerry and pursuing guerrilla warfare. In January 1923, he, along with John Joe Sheehy, led an attack on the National Army barracks at Castlemaine, using an improvised mortar.

Political career
McEllistrim was elected to the Dáil as a TD for Kerry in August 1923, only months after the end of the civil war, as a republican candidate. He came third in the county with 7,277 votes. He remained a TD for the Kerry constituency, and later of Kerry North from 1926 to 1969. After 1926, he followed much the republican leadership into Fianna Fáil. His son, Tom McEllistrim, and his grandson, also Tom McEllistrim also represented the Kerry North constituency.

See also
Families in the Oireachtas

References

1894 births
1973 deaths
Irish Republican Army (1919–1922) members
People of the Irish War of Independence
People of the Irish Civil War (Anti-Treaty side)
Irish Republican Army (1922–1969) members
Fianna Fáil TDs
Members of the 4th Dáil
Members of the 5th Dáil
Members of the 6th Dáil
Members of the 7th Dáil
Members of the 8th Dáil
Members of the 9th Dáil
Members of the 10th Dáil
Members of the 11th Dáil
Members of the 12th Dáil
Members of the 13th Dáil
Members of the 14th Dáil
Members of the 15th Dáil
Members of the 16th Dáil
Members of the 17th Dáil
Members of the 18th Dáil
Early Sinn Féin politicians
Irish farmers
Politicians from County Kerry